Auchenionchus is a genus of labrisomid blennies endemic to the Pacific waters off of Chile,

Species
Auchenionchus contains these currently recognized species:
 Auchenionchus crinitus (Jenyns, 1841)
 Auchenionchus microcirrhis (Valenciennes, 1836)
 Auchenionchus variolosus (Valenciennes, 1836)

Etymology
The generic name is a compound of the Greek  meaning "neck" or "nape" and  meaning "tubercle" or "protuberance", this is presumed to refer to the tiny nuchal tentacle of the type species.

References

 
Labrisomidae